The 1906–07 Butler Bulldogs men's basketball team represents Butler University during the 1906–07 college men's basketball season. The head coach was Art Guedel, coaching in his second season with the Bulldogs.

Schedule

|-

References

Butler Bulldogs men's basketball seasons
Butler
Butl
Butl